

A

 A: (1965, 1998 Kannada & 1998 Japanese)
 A Aa E Ee: (2009 Tamil & 2009 Telugu)
 A-ge-man (1990)
 A-Haunting We Will Go (1942)
 A Rodeo Film (2021)
 The A-Team (2010)
 A.K.G. (2007)

Aa

 Aa Ab Laut Chalen (1999)
 Aa Ammayi Gurinchi Meeku Cheppali (2022)
 Aa Chithrashalabham Parannotte (1970)
 Aa Dekhen Zara (2009)
 Aa Dinagalu (2007)
 Aa Divasam (1982)
 Aa Gale Lag Jaa: (1973 & 1994)
 Aa Jaa Sanam (1975)
 Aa Naluguru (2004)
 Aa Neram Alppa Dooram (1985)
 Aa Nimisham (1977)
 Aa Okkadu (2009)
 Aa Okkati Adakku (1992)
 Aa Raathri (1983)

Aaa-Aay

 Aaaaaaaah! (2015)
 Aaaah (2014)
 Aaag Hi Aag (1999)
 Aaah (2001)
 Aaahh Belinda (1986)
 Aabhaasam (2018)
 Aabhijathyam (1971)
 Aabra Ka Daabra (2004)
 Aabroo (1943)
 Aabroo (1968)
 Aabshar (1953)
 Aachariyangal (2012)
 Aacharya (2006)
 Aacharyan (1993)
 Aachi & Ssipak (2006)
 Aada Paduchu (1967)
 Aadaalla Majaka (1995)
 Aadab Arz (1943)
 Aadama Jaichomada (2014)
 Aadamkhor (1986)
 Aadanthe Ado Type (2013)
 Aadarsa Kutumbam (1969)
 Aadarsham (1993)
 Aadat Se Majboor (1982)
 Aadavaallu Meeku Joharlu (1981)
 Aadavallu Meeku Joharlu (2022)
 Aadavari Matalaku Arthale Verule (2007)
 Aadhaaram (1992)
 Aadharsam (1982)
 Aadharshila (1982)
 Aadhi (2018)
 Aadhi Haqeeqat, Aadha Fasana (1990)
 Aadhi Mimansa (1991)
 Aadhi Raat (1950)
 Aadhi Raat Ke Baad (1965)
 Aadhi Thaalam (1990)
 Aadhityan (1993)
 Aadhya Paadam (1977)
 Aadhyamayi (1991)
 Aadhyate Anubhavam (1987)
 Aadhyathe Katha (1972)
 Aadi (2002)
 Aadi Mimansa (1991)
 Aadi Velli (1990)
 Aadipaapam (1979)
 Aadithya (1996)
 Aadmi (1939, 1968 & 1993)
 Aadmi Aur Aurat (1984)
 Aadmi Aur Insaan (1969)
 Aadmi Khilona Hai (1993)
 Aadmi Sadak Ka (1977)
 Aadu (2015)
 Aadu Magaadra Bujji (2013)
 Aadu Puli (2011)
 Aadu Puli Attam (1977)
 Aadukalam (2011)
 Aadum Koothu (2005)
 Aadyakiranangal (1964)
 Aadyathe Anuraagam (1983)
 Aadyathe Kanmani (1995)
 Aafat (1977)
 Aag: (1948, 1994 & 2007)
 Aag Aandhi Aur Toofan (1994)
 Aag Aur Chingari (1994)
 Aag Aur Daag (1970)
 Aag Aur Shola (1986)
 Aag Hi Aag (1987)
 Aag Ka Dariya (1953)
 Aag Ka Gola (1990)
 Aag Ka Toofan (1993)
 Aag Ke Sholay (1988)
 Aag Laga Do Sawan Ko (1991)
 Aag Se Khelenge (1989)
 Aagadu (2014)
 Aagamanam (1980)
 Aagatha (1995)
 Aagathan (2010)
 Aagaya Thamaraigal (1985)
 Aage Badho (1947)
 Aage Kadam (1943)
 Aage Ki Soch (1988)
 Aagey Se Right (2009)
 Aaghaaz (2000)
 Aagneyam (1993)
 Aagraham (1984)
 Aah (1953)
 Aaha Kalyanam (2014)
 Aahaa..! (1997 & 1998)
 Aahaa Enna Porutham (1997)
 Aahaa Ethanai Azhagu (2003)
 Aahat – Ek Ajib Kahani (2010)
 Aahuti (1950 & 1978)
 Aahvaanam (1997)
 Aai (2004)
 Aai Bahar (1946)
 Aaina: (1974 & 1993)
 Aaj Ka Arjun (1990)
 Aaja Nachle (2007)
 Aakhree Raasta (1986)
 Aakrosh: (1980, 1998 & 2010)
 Aalvar (2006)
 Aamdani Atthani Kharcha Rupaiyaa (2001)
 Aamir (2008)
 Aan (1952)
 Aan: Men at Work (2004)
 Aanaval Mothiram (1990)
 Aandhi (1975)
 Aankh Michouli (1942)
 Aankhen: (1950, 1968, 1993 & 2002)
 Aao Pyaar Karen (1994)
 Aapathbandhavudu (1992)
 Aap Mujhe Achche Lagne Lage (2002)
 Aapo (1994)
 Aar Paar (1954)
 Aarakshan (2011)
 Aaron Loves Angela (1975)
 Aaru (2005)
 Aarzoo (1999)
 Aasai: (1956 & 1995)
 Aasai Aasaiyai (2003)
 Aasai Alaigal (1963)
 Aasai Manaivi (1977)
 Aasai Mugam (1965)
 Aasai Thambi (1998)
 Aasaiyil Oru Kaditham (1999)
 Aasal (2010)
 Aasha Encounter (2022)
 Aashayein (2010)
 Aashiq: (1962 & 2001)
 Aashiq Banaya Aapne: Love Takes Over (2005)
 Aashiq Awara (1993)
 Aashiq Banaya Aapne (2005)
 Aashiqui: (1990 & 2015)
 Aashiqui 2 (2013)
 Aathi (2006)
 Aatish: Feel the Fire (1994)
 Aatma: (2006 & 2013)
 Aaye Din Bahar Ke (1966)
 Aayitha Ezhuthu (2004)
 Aayushkalam (1992)

Ab

 Ab Dilli Dur Nahin (1957)
 Ab Tak Chhappan (2004)
 Ab Tak Chhappan 2 (2015)
 Ab To Aaja Saajan Mere (1994)
 Ab Tumhare Hawale Watan Saathiyo (2004)

Aba-Aby

 Abacus: Small Enough to Jail (2016)
 Abakada... Ina (2001)
 Abala (1973)
 Abalai Anjugam (1959)
 Aballay (2010)
 Abana (1958)
 Abandon (2002)
 Abandon de poste (2010)
 Abandoned: (1949, 1955, 2001, 2010 & 2019)
 The Abandoned: (1955 & 2006)
 Abandoned and Deceived (1995 TV)
 Abandoned Mine (2012)
 The Abandonment (1916)
 Abang Long Fadil (2014)
 Abang Long Fadil 2 (2017)
 Abar Aranye (2003)
 Abar Basanta Bilap (2018)
 Abar Boshonto (2019)
 Abar Byomkesh (2012)
 Abar Ekla Cholo (2016 TV)
 Abar, the First Black Superman (1977)
 Abar Tora Manush Ho (1973)
 Abashiri Prison (1965)
 ABBA: The Movie (1977)
 Abbott and Costello series:
 Abbott and Costello in the Foreign Legion (1950)
 Abbott and Costello Go to Mars (1953)
 Abbott and Costello in Hollywood (1945)
 Abbott and Costello Meet Captain Kidd (1952)
 Abbott and Costello Meet Dr. Jekyll and Mr. Hyde (1953)
 Abbott and Costello Meet Frankenstein (1948)
 Abbott and Costello Meet the Invisible Man (1951)
 Abbott and Costello Meet the Keystone Kops (1955)
 Abbott and Costello Meet the Killer, Boris Karloff (1949)
 Abbott and Costello Meet the Mummy (1955)
 Abby (1974)
 ABCD (2005)
 ABCD: Any Body Can Dance (2013)
 ABCD 2 (2015)
 The ABCs of Death series:
 The ABCs of Death (2012)
 ABCs of Death 2 (2014)
 ABCs of Death 2.5 (2016)
 The Abdication (1974)
 Abduction: (1975 & 2011)
 Abduction: The Megumi Yokota Story (2006)
 Abe Lincoln in Illinois (1940)
 Abel's Island (1988)
 Aberdeen (2002)
 Aberration (1997)
 Abhijan (1962)
 Abhimaan (1973)
 Abhimanyu: (1948, 1989 & 1991)
 Abnormal Family: Older Brother's Bride (1984)
 Abominable: (2006 & 2019)
 The Abominable Dr. Phibes (1971)
 The Abominable Snowman (1957)
 About Adam (2000)
 About a Boy (2002)
 About Cherry (2012)
 About Elly (2009)
 About Endlessness (2019)
 About Last Night... (1986)
 About Last Night (2014)
 About Schmidt (2002)
 About Time: (1962 & 2013)
 Above the Law (1988)
 Above the Mountains (1992)
 Above the Rim (1994)
 Above Suspicion: (1943 & 1995)
 Abraham (1994)
 Abraham and Eugenia: Stories from Jewish Cuba (1994)
 Abraham Lincoln: (1924 & 1930)
 Abraham Lincoln: Vampire Hunter (2012)
 Abraham's Gold (1990)
 Abraham's Valley (1993)
 Abraxas, Guardian of the Universe (1991)
 Abruptio (2023)
 Absence of Malice (1981)
 The Absent-Minded Professor (1961)
 Absentia (2011)
 Absolut Warhola (2001)
 Absolute Power (1997)
 Absolutely Anything (2015)
 The Abyss (1989)

Ac

 ACAB – All Cops Are Bastards (2012)
 Acacia (2003)
 Academy: (1996 TV & 2007)
 Acapulco (1952)
 Acapulco Gold (1976)
 Acasă, My Home (2020)
 Accattone (1961)
 Acceleration (2019)
 Acceptance (2009)
 Accepted (2006)
 Accidence (2018)
 Accident: (1928, 1967, 1976, 1985, 2008, 2009, 2012 & 2013)
 The Accident (1963)
 Accident 703 (1962)
 Accident on Hill Road (2009)
 Accident Man (2018)
 Accidental Death (1963)
 The Accidental Detective (2015)
 The Accidental Detective 2: In Action (2018)
 Accidental Hero (1992)
 The Accidental Husband (2008)
 The Accidental Prime Minister (2019)
 The Accidental Spy (2001)
 The Accidental Tourist (1988)
 Accidents Happen (2009)
 Accidents to the Taxes!! (1951)
 Accidents Will Happen (1938)
 Acción mutante (1993)
 The Accompanist (1992)
 Accomplice (1946)
 Accomplices (2009)
 The Accountant: (2001 & 2016)
 Accumulator 1 (1994)
 Accused: (1936, 1964, 2005 & 2014)
 The Accused: (1949, 1960, 1988 & 2018)
 Accused of Murder (1956)
 The Accused Uncle Shangang (1994)
 Ace Drummond (1936)
 Ace High: (1918, 1919 & 1968)
 Ace in the Hole: (1942 & 1951)
 Ace Ventura series:
 Ace Ventura: Pet Detective (1994)
 Ace Ventura: When Nature Calls (1995)
 Ace Ventura Jr.: Pet Detective (2009)
 Aces Go Place series:
 Aces Go Places (1982)
 Aces Go Places 2 (1983)
 Aces Go Places 3 (1984)
 Aces Go Places 4 (1986)
 Aces High (1976)
 Aces: Iron Eagle III (1992)
 Achan: (1952 & 2011)
 Acharya (2022)
 Achut Kanya (1936)
 The Acid House (1998)
 Acquitted for Having Committed the Deed (1992)
Acrimony (2018)
 Across 110th Street (1972)
 Across the Bridge (1957)
 Across the Pacific (1942)
 Across the River and Into the Trees (2022)
 Across the Tracks (1991)
 Across the Universe (2007)
 Across the Wide Missouri (1951)
 The Act of Killing (2012)
 The Act in Question (1994)
 Act of Valor (2012)
 Act of Vengeance (1986)
 Act of Violence: (1949, 1956, & 1959)
 Action Jackson: (1988 & 2014)
 Action in the North Atlantic (1943)
Action Replayy (2010)
Action: The October Crisis of 1970 (1973)
 Actor: (1993 & 2016)
 Acts of Vengeance (2017)

Ad

 Ad Astra (2019)
 Ad Fundum (1993)
 Ad-lib Night (2006)

Ada

 Ada: (1961 & 2019)
 Ada... A Way of Life (2010)
 Ada Apa Dengan Cinta?: (2002 & 2014)
 Ada Apa Dengan Cinta? 2 (2016)
 Ada Apa Dengan Rina (2013)
 Adada (1987)
 Adada Enna Azhagu (2009)
 Adagio (2000)
 Adalat: (1958 & 1976)
 Adalat o Ekti Meye (1981)
 Adalu Badalu (1979)
 Adam: (1983 TV, 1992, 2009, 2019 American, 2019 Moroccan & 2020)
 Adam at 6 A.M. (1970)
 Adam Bede (1918)
 Adam and the Devil (2007)
 Adam and Dog (2011)
 Adam & Eva (1997)
 Adam and Eve: (1923, 1928, 1949, 1953 & 1969)
 Adam and Evelyne (1949)
 Adam and Evil: (1927 & 2004)
 Adam & Paul (2004)
 The Adam Project (2022)
 Adam and the Serpent (1946)
 Adam & Steve (2005)
 Adam, Eve and Datsa (2011)
 Adam's Apple (1928)
 Adam's Apples (2005)
 Adam's Rib: (1923, 1949 & 1990)
 Adam's Testament (2017)
 Adam's Tree (1936)
 Adam's Wall (2008)
 Adam's Woman (1970)
 Adama (2015)
 Adaminte Makan Abu (2011)
 Adaminte Vaariyellu (1984)
 Adanga Maru (2018)
 Adanggaman (2000)
 Adaptation. (2002)
 Adaraneeya Kathawak (2016)
 Adarawanthayo (1968)
 Adaraye Namayen (2008)
 Adarei Man (2018)

Add-Ady

 The Addams Family series:
 The Addams Family: (1991 & 2019)
 The Addams Family 2 (2021)
 Addams Family Reunion (1998)
 Addams Family Values (1993)
 The Adderall Diaries (2015)
 Addicted: (2002 & 2008)
 Addicted to Love (1997)
 The Addiction (1995)
 Addiction (2004)
 Address Unknown: (1944 & 2001)
 Adele (1919)
 Adelheid (1970)
 Adha Din Aadhi Raat (1977)
 Adharm (1992)
 Adharmam (1994)
 Adharvam (1989)
 Adhe Kangal (2017)
 Adhe Neram Adhe Idam (2009)
 Adhibar (2015)
 Adhikar: (1939, 1954, 1971 & 1986)
 Adhikaram (1980)
 Adhikari (1991)
 Adhinayak (2006)
 Adhinayakudu (2012)
 Adhineta (2009)
 Adhipan (1989)
 Adhipathi (2001)
 Adhisaya Manithan (1990)
 Adhisaya Ulagam (2012)
 Adhisayappiravigal (1982)
 Adhithan Kanavu (1948)
 Adhiyar (2003)
 Adho Andha Paravai Pola (TBD)
 Adholokam (1988)
 Adhu (2004)
 Adhu Antha Kaalam (1988)
 Adhu Oru Kana Kaalam (2005)
 Adhugo (2018)
 Adhuri Kahani (1939)
 Adhurs (2010)
 Adhwaytham (1992)
 Adhyan (2015)
 Adhyapika (1968)
 Adhyarathri (2019)
 Adhyayam Onnu Muthal (1985)
 Adi Shankaracharya (1983)
 Adieu l'ami (1968)
 Adikkurippu (1989)
 Adima Changala (1981)
 Adimadhyantham (2011)
 Adimai Changili (1997)
 Adimai Penn (1969)
 Adimakal (1969)
 Adimakal Udamakal (1987)
 Adimakkachavadam (1978)
 Adios Amigos (2016)
 Adiós, Sabata (1971)
 Adipurush (2023)
 Adirindi Alludu (1996)
 Adithya Varma (2019)
 Adiyozhukkukal (1984)
 Adiyum Andamum (2014)
 Adjust Your Tracking (2013)
 The Adjuster (1991)
 The Adjustment Bureau (2011)
 The Admirable Crichton: (1918, 1957 & 1968 TV)
 Admiral (2008)
 Admiral Nakhimov (1947)
 Admiral Ushakov (1953)
 Admission (2013)
 Admissions (2011)
 Admission by Guts (2015)
 The Adolescent (1979)
 Adopt a Highway (2019)
 Adoption (1975)
 Adoration: (1928, 2008, 2013 & 2019)
 Adore (2013)
 Adrenaline Rush (2002)
 Adrift: (1911, 2009 Brazilian, 2009 Vietnamese, 2018)
 Adrift in Tokyo (2007)
 Adultery: (1945 & 1989)
 Adultery Italian Style (1966)
 Adutha Varisu (1995)
 Adventure: (1925, 1945 & 2011)
 The Adventure of Faustus Bidgood (1986)
 The Adventure of Iron Pussy (2003)
 The Adventure of Sherlock Holmes' Smarter Brother (1975)
 The Adventure of Sudsakorn (1979)
 Adventure for Two (1943)
 Adventureland (2009)
 The Adventurer: (1917 & 1928)
 The Adventurers: (1951 & 1970)
 The Adventurer: The Curse of the Midas Box (2014)
 Adventures in Babysitting: (1987 & 2016 TV)
 The Adventures of Baron Munchausen (1988)
 The Adventures of Barry McKenzie (1972)
 The Adventures of Brer Rabbit (2006)
 The Adventures of Buckaroo Banzai Across the 8th Dimension (1984)
 The Adventures of Bullwhip Griffin (1967)
 Adventures of Captain Fabian (1951)
 Adventures of Captain Marvel (1941)
 Adventures of a Dentist (1965)
 Adventures of Don Juan (1948)
 The Adventures of Elmo in Grouchland (1999)
 The Adventures of Ford Fairlane (1990)
 The Adventures of Frontier Fremont (1976)
 The Adventures of Huck Finn (1993)
 The Adventures of Huckleberry Finn: (1939 & 1960)
 The Adventures of Ichabod and Mr. Toad (1949)
 Adventures of Juku the Dog (1931)
 The Adventures of Kathlyn (1913)
 The Adventures of Mary-Kate & Ashley series:
 The Adventures of Mary-Kate & Ashley: The Case of the Christmas Caper (1995)
 The Adventures of Mary-Kate & Ashley: The Case of the Fun House Mystery (1994)
 The Adventures of Mary-Kate & Ashley: The Case of the Hotel Who-Done-It (1994)
 The Adventures of Mary-Kate & Ashley: The Case of the Logical i Ranch (1994)
 The Adventures of Mary-Kate & Ashley: The Case of the Mystery Cruise (1995)
 The Adventures of Mary-Kate & Ashley: The Case of the SeaWorld Adventure (1995)
 The Adventures of Mary-Kate & Ashley: The Case of the Shark Encounter (1995)
 The Adventures of Mary-Kate & Ashley: The Case of Thorn Mansion (1994)
 The Adventures of Mary-Kate & Ashley: The Case of the U.S. Space Camp Mission (1997)
 The Adventures of Mary-Kate & Ashley: The Case of the United States Navy Adventure (1997)
 The Adventures of Mary-Kate & Ashley: The Case of the Volcano Mystery (1997)
 The Adventures of Milo and Otis (1989)
 Adventures of Nils Holgersson (1962)
 Adventures of Omanakuttan (2017)
 Adventures of the Penguin King (2013)
 Adventures of Petrov and Vasechkin, Usual and Incredible (1983)
 The Adventures of Pinocchio (1972, 1996 & unreleased)
 Adventures of a Plumber's Mate (1978)
 The Adventures of Pluto Nash (2002)
 Adventures of Power (2008)
 The Adventures of Prince Achmed (1926)
 The Adventures of Priscilla, Queen of the Desert (1994)
 Adventures of a Private Eye (1977)
 Adventures of the Queen (1975 TV)
 Adventures of Red Ryder (1940)
 The Adventures of Rex and Rinty (1935)
 Adventures of Ricky Deen (TBD)
 Adventures of the Road-Runner (1964)
 The Adventures of Robin Hood (1938)
 Adventures of Robinson Crusoe, a Sailor from York (1982)
 The Adventures of Rocky and Bullwinkle (2000)
 Adventures of Rusty (1945)
 Adventures of Serial Buddies (2011)
 The Adventures of Sharkboy and Lavagirl in 3-D (2005)
 The Adventures of Sherlock Holmes (1939)
 Adventures of Sherlock Holmes; or, Held for Ransom (1905)
 The Adventures of Sinbad 2 (2014)
 Adventures of Sinbad the Sailor (1974)
 Adventures of Sir Galahad (1949)
 Adventures of Tarzan (1985)
 Adventures of a Taxi Driver (1976)
 The Adventures of Tintin (2011)
 The Adventures of Tom Sawyer (1938)
 The Adventures of Tom Thumb and Thumbelina (2002)
 The Adventures of a Two-Minute Werewolf (1985)
 Adventures in Wild California (2000)
 The Adventures of the Wilderness Family (1975)
 Adventures of William Tell (1898)
 Adventures of the Yellow Suitcase (1970)
 Advise & Consent (1962)
 Adwa (1999)
 Adyaksha in America (2019)

Ae

 Ae Dil Hai Mushkil (2016)
 Ae Fond Kiss... (2004)
 Ae Jugara Krushna Sudama (2003)
 Ae Kaash Ke Hum (2020)
 Aedan (2018)
 Aeg elada, aeg armastada (1976)
 Aegri Somnia (2008)
 Aelita (1924)
 Aelita, Do Not Pester Men! (1988)
 Aera! Aera! Aera! (1972)
 Aerial Anarchists (1911)
 An Aerial Joy Ride (1917)
 An Aerial Joyride (1916)
 Aerials (2016)
 Aerograd (1935)
 The Aeronauts (2019)
 Aesop's Film Fables (1921)
 Aetbaar (2004)
 Aethiree (2004)
 Æon Flux (2005)

Af

 An Affair (1998)
 The Affair of the Necklace (2001)
 An Affair to Remember (1957)
 Affair with a Stranger (1953)
 The Affair of Susan (1935)
 Affair in Trinidad (1952)
 The Affairs of Anatol (1921)
 Affairs of the Art (2021)
 Affairs of Cappy Ricks (1937)
 The Affairs of Cellini (1934)
 The Affairs of Susan (1945)
 Afflicted (2013)
 The Afflicted (2011)
 Affliction: (1996 & 1997)
 Afghan Breakdown (1990)
 Aflatoon (1997)
 Afraid to Die (1960)
 Africa Screams (1949)
 Africa: The Serengeti (1994)
 African Cats (2011)
 The African Doctor (2016)
 The African Lion (1955)
 The African Queen (1951)
 After: (2009, 2012 & 2019)
 After All (2006)
 After All It's Only Life (1993)
 After the Apocalypse (2004)
 After the Ball: (1897, 1914, 1924, 1932, 1957 & 2015)
 After Dark, My Sweet (1990)
 After Death (1988)
 After Dusk They Come (2009)
 After Earth (2013)
 After Everything (2018)
 After the Fox (1966)
 After Hours (1985)
 After Jimmy (1996)
 After Life (1998)
 After Midnight: (1927, 1989, 2004, 2014 & 2019)
 After Office Hours (1935)
 After the Rain (1999)
 After the Rehearsal (1984 TV)
 After School: (1972 & 2003)
 After the Show (1921)
 After Stonewall (1999)
 After the Storm: (1915, 1928, 1948, 2001 & 2016)
 After Sundown: (1911 & 2006)
 After the Sunset (2004)
 After the Thin Man (1936)
 After Tonight (1933)
 After We Collided (2020)
 After We Fell (2021)
 After the Wedding: (1962, 2006 & 2019)
 After Yang (2021)
 After.Life (2009)
 Afterglow (1997)
 Afterimage (2016)
 AfterLife (2003)
 Aftermath: (1990, 1994, 2004, 2012, 2014 & 2017)
 The Aftermath: (1982 & 2019)
 Aftermath: The Remnants of War (2001)
 Afterschool (2008)
 Aftershock (2010 & 2012)
 Aftersun (2022)

Ag-Ak

 Against All Odds: (1924, 1984 & 2011)
 Against the Current (2009)
 Against the Dark (2009)
 Against the Ice (2022)
 Against the Ropes (2004)
 Against The Wall: (1994 TV & 2010)
 Against the Wind (1948)
 Agantuk (1991)
 Agatha (1979)
 The Age of Adaline (2015)
 The Age of Consent (1932)
 Age of Consent (1969)
 The Age of Innocence: (1924, 1934 & 1993)
 The Age of Insects (1990)
 The Age of Pioneers (2017)
 The Age of Shadows (2016)
 Age of Success (1988)
 Age of Uprising: The Legend of Michael Kohlhaas (2013)
 Agent Cody Banks (2003)
 Agent Cody Banks 2: Destination London (2004)
 Agent F.O.X. (2015)
 Agent Carter (2013)
 Agent for H.A.R.M. (1966)
 Agent Orange (2004)
 Agent Vinod: (1977 & 2012)
 Agent Wild Duck (2002)
 The Ages of Lulu (1990)
Aggar (2007)
 The Aggressives: (2005 American & 2005 South Korean)
 Agneepath: (1990 & 2012)
 Agnes (2021)
 Agnes of God (1985)
 Agnes and His Brothers (2004)
Agni Sakshi: (1982, 1996 & 1999)
 Agony: (1981 & 2020)
 The Agony and the Ecstasy (1965)
 Agora (2009)
 Agraja (2014)
 Aguirre, the Wrath of God (1972)
 Agustina of Aragon: (1929 & 1950)
 Ah! Nomugi Toge (1979)
 Ah, Wilderness! (1935)
 Ahasin Wetei (2009)
Ahista Ahista: (1981 & 2016)
 Ahingsa-Jikko mee gam (2005)
 Ahí está el detalle (1940)
 Ahora o nunca (2015)
 Ai City (1986)
 Ai Weiwei: The Fake Case (2013)
 Ai Weiwei: Never Sorry (2012)
 Ai-Fak (2004)
 Aida: (1953 & 1987)
 Aikatsu! The Movie (2014)
 Aikatsu! Music Award: Minna de Shō o MoraimaSHOW! (2015)
 Aileen Wuornos: The Selling of a Serial Killer (1992)
 Aileen: Life and Death of a Serial Killer (2003)
 Aimée & Jaguar (1999)
 Ain't Them Bodies Saints (2013)
 Aina: (1977 & 2013)
 Ainbo: Spirit of the Amazon (2021)
 Air America (1990)
 Air Bud series:
 Air Bud (1997)
 Air Bud Spikes Back (2003)
 Air Buddies (2006)
 Air Bud: Golden Receiver (1998)
 Air Bud: Seventh Inning Fetch (2002)
 Air Bud: Spikes Back (2003)
 Air Bud: World Pup (2000)
 Air Force (1943)
 Air Force One (1997)
 The Air I Breathe (2007)
 Air Raid Wardens (1943)
 The Air Up There (1994)
 Airborne: (1962 & 1993)
 Airheads (1994)
 Airlift (2016)
 Airplane! (1980)
 Airplane II: The Sequel (1982)
 Airport: (1970, 1993 & 2009)
 Airport '77 (1977)
 Airport 1975 (1974)
 Airspeed (1998)
 The Airzone Solution (1993)
 Aisha (2010)
 Aitraaz (2004)
 Ajab Gazabb Love (2012)
 Ajab Prem Ki Ghazab Kahani (2009)
 Ajay: (1996 & 2006)
 Ajnabee: (1974 & 2001)
 Ajooba (1991)
 Ajooba Kudrat Ka (1991)
 AKA (2002)
 Akasha Gopuram (2006)
 Akayla (1991)
 Akbar-Jodha (2007)
 Akele Hum Akele Tum (1995)
 Akira: (1988, 2016 Hindi, 2016 Kannada)
 Akkada Abbai Ikkada Ammayi (1996)
 Akkare Akkare Akkare (1990)
Akhiyon Se Goli Maare (2002)
 Akrobatisches Potpourri (1895)
 Akropol (1995)
 Aks: (2001 & 2018)
 Aksar (2006)
 L'Âge d'Or (1930)
 Águila o sol (1937)

Al 

 Al Davis vs. the NFL (2021)
 Al Franken: God Spoke (2006)
 Al Haram (1965)
 Al-Kompars (1993)
 Al-Lail (1992)

Ala-Aly

 Ala-Arriba! (1942)
 Aladdin (Golden Films, 1992)
 Aladdin and His Wonderful Lamp (1939)
 Aladdin series:
 Aladdin: (1992 & 2019)
 Aladdin and the King of Thieves (1996)
 Alag (2006)
 Alai (2003)
 Alaipayuthey (2000)
 Alam Ara (1931)
 Alambrado (1991)
 Alambrista! (1977)
 The Alamo: (1936, 1960 & 2004)
 The Alamo: 13 Days to Glory (1987 TV)
 Alan and Naomi (1992)
 An Alan Smithee Film: Burn Hollywood Burn (1998)
 Alarm Bells (1949)
 The Alarmist (1997)
 Alas de Mariposa (1991)
 Alaska: (1944, 1996)
 Alaska: Spirit of the Wild (1997)
 Alatriste (2006)
 Albela: (1951, 1971 & 2001)
 Albert (2016)
 Albert Nobbs (2011)
 Albert RN (1953)
 Albino Alligator (1996)
 The Alchemist Cookbook (2016)
 Alegre Ma Non Troppo (1994)
 Aletta Jacobs: Het Hoogste Streven (1995)
 Alex Cross (2012)
 Alex and Emma (2003)
 Alexander: (1996, 2004 & 2008)
 Alexander the Great: (1956 & 2010)
 Alexander the Last (2009)
 Alexander Nevsky (1938)
 Alexander Popov (1949)
 Alexander and the Terrible, Horrible, No Good, Very Bad Day (2014)
 Alexander's Ragtime Band (1938)
 Alexandra's Project (2003)
 Alexandria (2005)
 Alfalfa's Aunt (1939)
 Alfie: (1966 & 2004)
 Alfie Darling (1975)
 Alfonsina (1957)
 Algiers (1938)
 Algol: Tragedy of Power (1920)
 Ali (2001)
 Ali Baba Bujang Lapok (1960)
 Ali Baba Goes to Town (1937)
 Ali G Indahouse (2002)
 Ali Zaoua: Prince of the Streets (2000)
 Ali: Fear Eats the Soul (1974)
 Alias Jesse James (1959)
 Alias Nick Beal (1949)
 Alias the Night Wind (1923)
 Alibaba and the Thief (2015)
Alibaba Aur 40 Chor: (1954, 1966 & 1980)
 Alibi: (1929, 1931, 1942 & 1969)
 The Alibi (2006)
 Alice: (1982, 1988, 1990, 2002, 2005, 2012 & 2022)
 Alice Adams (1935)
 Alice in the Cities (1974)
 Alice Doesn't Live Here Anymore (1974)
 Alice and Martin (1998)
 Alice Through the Looking Glass: (1987, 1998 TV & 2016)
 Alice in Wonderland: (1903, 1915, 1931, 1933, 1949, 1951, 1966, 1976, 1985 TV, 1988, 1999 TV, 2005 & 2010)
 Alice of Wonderland in Paris (1966)
 Alice, Darling (2022)
 Alice, Sweet Alice (1976)
 Alice's Adventures in Wonderland: (1910 short & 1972)
 Alice's Restaurant (1969)
 Alicia (1974)
 Alien series:
 Alien (1979)
 Aliens (1986)
 Alien 3 (1992)
 Alien Resurrection (1997)
 Prometheus (2012)
 Alien: Covenant (2017)
 Alien 2: On Earth (1980)
 Alien Abduction: (2005 & 2014)
 Alien Adventure (1999)
 Alien Apocalypse (2005 TV)
 Alien Autopsy (2006)
 Alien Contamination (1980)
 Alien Dead (1980)
 The Alien Encounters (1979)
 Alien Hunter (2003) (TV)
 Alien Intruder (1993)
 Alien Lockdown (2004) (TV)
 Alien Love Triangle (2008)
 Alien Nation series:
 Alien Nation (1988)
 Alien Nation: Body and Soul (1995)
 Alien Nation: Dark Horizon (1994)
 Alien Nation: The Enemy Within (1996)
 Alien Nation: Millennium (1996)
 Alien Nation: The Udara Legacy (1997)
 Alien vs. Predator (2004)
 Aliens vs. Predator: Requiem (2007)
 Alienator (1989) (TV)
 Aliens in the Attic (2009)
 Aliens of the Deep (2005)
 Alila (2003)
 Alison's Birthday (1981)
 Alissa in Concert (1990)
 Alita: Battle Angel (2019)
 Alive: (1993, 2002, 2006, 2014 & 2020)
 Alive: 20 Years Later (1993)
 All About Anna (2005)
 All About the Benjamins (2002)
 All About Eve (1950)
 All About Evil (2010)
 All About Lily Chou-Chou (2001)
 All About My Mother (1999)
 All About Steve (2009)
 All About Women (2008)
 All Apologies (2012)
 All Around the Town (2002)
 All the Boys Are Called Patrick (1957)
 All the Boys Love Mandy Lane (2006)
 All the Colors of the Dark (1972)
 All Creatures Great and Small (1974)
 An All Dogs Christmas Carol (1998)
 All Dogs Go to Heaven (1989)
 All Dogs Go to Heaven 2 (1996)
 All Eyez on Me (2017)
 All Fall Down (1962)
 All Good Things (2010)
 All Hallows' Eve: (2013 & 2016)
 All Hallows' Eve 2 (2015)
 All Hands on Deck: (1961 & 2020)
 All Hell Broke Loose (1995)
 All I Want (2002)
 All I Want for Christmas (1991)
 All Is Well: (2011, 2015 & 2018)
 All Is Lost (2013)
 All Is True (2018)
 All the Invisible Children (2005)
 All the King's Men: (1949, 1971 TV, 1999 TV & 2006)
 All Ladies Do It (1992)
 All Light Will End (2018)
 All Light, Everywhere (2021)
 All of Me: (1934 & 1984)
 All Men Are Mortal (1995)
 All Monsters Attack (1969)
 All My Babies (1953)
 All My Compatriots (1968)
 All My Friends Are Funeral Singers (2010)
 All My Friends Hate Me (2021)
 All My Lenins (1997)
 All My Life: (1966, 2004, 2008 & 2020)
 All My Loved Ones (1999)
 All My Sons (1948)
 All Night Long: (1962 & 1981)
 All Night Long series:
 All Night Long (1992)
 All Night Long 2 (1995)
 All Night Long 3 (1996)
 All or Nothing (2002)
 All Over the Guy (2001)
 All Over Me (1997)
 All the Best (2009)
 All the Bright Places (2020)
 All the Money in the World (2017)
 All the President's Men (1976)
 All the Pretty Horses (2000)
 All the Queen's Men (2001)
 All Quiet on the Western Front: (1930, 1979 & 2022)
 All the Real Girls (2003)
 All the Right Moves (1983)
 All Roads Lead Home (2008)
 All Roads Lead to Rome: (1949 & 2015)
 All Roads to Pearla (2019)
 All Souls Day (2005)
 All That Falls Has Wings (1990)
 All That Heaven Allows (1955)
 All That Jazz (1979)
 All These Sleepless Nights (2016)
 All These Women (1964)
 All Things Fair (1995)
 All This and Rabbit Stew (1941)
 All This, and Heaven Too (1940)
 All Through the Night (1941)
 All Together Now (2008)
 All Under the Moon (1993)
 All for the Winner (1990)
 All You Need Is Cash (1978)
 All You Need Is Love (2015)
 All's Well, Ends Well (1992)
 All's Well, Ends Well Too (1993)
 All-American Murder (1992)
 Allan Quatermain and the Lost City of Gold (1987)
 Allari Bullodu (2005)
 Allegro Non Troppo (1977)
 Allende en su laberinto (2014)
 Alles auf Zucker! (2004)
 Alley Cats Strike (2000) (TV)
 Allied (2016)
 Alligator (1980)
 Alligator II: The Mutation (1990)
 The Allnighter (1987)
 All-Star Weekend (TBD)
 Alluda Majaka (1995)
 Almanac of Fall (1984)
 The Almond and the Seahorse (2022)
 Almost An Angel (1990)
 Almost Angels (1962)
 Almost Christmas (2016)
 Almost Famous (2000)
 Almost Friends: (2014 & 2016)
 Almost a Gentleman: (1938 & 1939)
 Almost Heroes (1998)
 Almost Human: (1927, 1974 & 2013)
 Almost Love (2006)
 Almost Married: (1919, 1932 & 1942)
 Almost Paris (2016)
 Almost Summer (1978)
 Almost There (2014)
 Almost You (1985)
 Aloha (2015)
 Alone: (1931 French, 1931 Soviet, 2004, 2007, 2008, 2015 Hindi, 2015 Kannada, 2020 horror, 2020 thriller & 2022)
 Alone in Berlin (2016)
 Alone in the Dark: (1982 & 2005)
 Along Came Polly (2004)
 Along Came a Spider (2001)
 Along with the Gods: The Last 49 Days (2018)
 Along with the Gods: The Two Worlds (2017)
 Along the Oregon Trail (1947)
 L'Alpagueur (1976)
 Alpha: (2018 & 2019)
 Alpha Dog (2006)
 Alpha and Omega (2010)
 Alphabet City (1984)
 The Alphabet Killer (2008)
 The Alphabet Murders (1965)
 Alphaville (1965)
 Alps (2011)
 The Alps (2007)
 Alraune: (1918, 1928, 1930 & 1952)
 Alraune, die Henkerstochter, genannt die rote Hanne (1918)
 Altar (2014)
 Altered (2007)
 Altered Species (2001)
 Altered States (1980)
 Altitude (2010)
 Altman (2014)
 Alucarda (1978)
 Alvin and the Chipmunks series:
 Alvin and the Chipmunks (2007)
 Alvin and the Chipmunks Meet Frankenstein (1999)
 Alvin and the Chipmunks Meet the Wolfman (2000)
 Alvin and the Chipmunks: Chipwrecked (2011)
 Alvin and the Chipmunks: Road Trip (2015)
 Alvin and the Chipmunks: The Squeakquel (2009)
 Alvin Purple (1973)
 Always: (1989 & 2011)
 Always Be My Maybe (2019$
 Always Sanchōme no Yūhi (2005)
 Alyas Batman en Robin (1991)

Am 

 Am I Guilty? (1940)
 Am I Ok? (2022)

Ama-Amy

 Amadeus (1984)
 Amai Muchi (2013)
 Amanaat (1994)
 Amandla!: A Revolution in Four-Part Harmony (2002)
 Amanecer (2009)
 Les Amants du Pont-Neuf (1991)
 Amar Akbar Anthony (1977)
 Amar Prem (1971)
 Amaram (1991)
 Amarcord (1973)
 Amarkalam (1999)
 Amateur (1994)
 The Amazing Colossal Man (1957)
 The Amazing Dr. Clitterhouse (1938)
 Amazing Grace: (1974, 2006 & 2015)
 The Amazing Grace (2006)
 The Amazing Howard Hughes (1977) (TV)
 The Amazing Maurice (2022)
 The Amazing Mr. Blunden (1972)
 The Amazing Mr. Williams (1939)
 The Amazing Mr. X (1948)
 The Amazing Mrs. Holliday (1943)
 The Amazing Panda Adventure (1995)
 The Amazing Spider-Man (2012)
 The Amazing Spider-Man 2 (2014)
 The Amazing Transparent Man (1960)
 The Amazing Truth About Queen Raquela (2008)
 Amazon: (1990, 1997 & 2000)
 Amazon Women on the Moon (1987)
 Amazons: (1984 TV & 1986)
 The Amazons (1917)
 The Ambassador: (1936, 1960, 1984 American, 1984 Croatian, 2005 TV & 2011)
 An Ambition Reduced to Ashes (1995)
 Amblin' (1968)
 Ambulance (2022)
 The Ambulance (1990)
 Ambush at Cimarron Pass (1958)
 The Ambushers (1967)
 Amelia (2009)
 Amelia Earhart (1976) (TV)
 Amélie (2001)
 Amen: (2010, 2011 & 2013)
 Amen. (2002)
 Amer (2009)
 America: (1924, 2009 TV & 2011)
 America America: (1963, 1983 & 1997)
 America: From Freedom to Fascism (2006)
 America's Heart and Soul (2004)
 America's Sweethearts (2001)
 The American: (1927 & 2010)
 American Animals (2018)
 The American Astronaut (2001)
 American Beach House (2015)
 American Beauty: (1927 & 1999)
 The American Beauty (1916)
 American Boy: A Profile of Steven Prince (1978)
 American Buffalo (1996)
 An American Carol (2008)
 American Casino (2009)
 An American Christmas Carol (1979) (TV)
 An American Crime (2007)
 American Desi (2001)
 American Dharma (2018)
 American Dog (2008)
 American Dream (1990)
 An American Dream (1966)
 The American Dream (2022)
 The American Dreamer (1971)
 American Dreamz (2006)
 The American Epic Sessions (2017)
 American Fable (2016)
 American Flyers (1985)
 The American Friend (1977)
 American Friends (1991)
 American Gangster (2007)
 The American Gangster (1992)
 American Gigolo (1980)
 American Girl (2002)
 American Girl (2021)
 American Girls (1918)
 American Gothic: (1988 & 2007)
 American Graffiti (1973)
 American Guerrilla in the Philippines (1950)
 American Gun: (2002 & 2005)
 American Hardcore (2006)
 An American Haunting (2006)
 American Heart (1992)
 American Heist (2014)
 An American Hippie in Israel (1972)
 American History X (1998)
 American Honey (2016)
 American Hustle (2013)
 American Kickboxer (1991)
 American Kickboxer 2 (1993)
 American Made (2017)
 American Madness (1932)
 American Mary (2012)
 American Me (1992)
 American Movie (1999)
 American Ninja series:
 American Ninja (1985)
 American Ninja 2: The Confrontation (1987)
 American Ninja 3: Blood Hunt (1989)
 American Ninja 4: The Annihilation (1990)
 American Ninja V (1993)
 American Outlaws (2001)
 An American in Paris (1951)
 American Pastime (2007)
 American Pastoral (2016)
 An American Pickle (2020)
 American Pie series:
 American Pie (1999)
 American Pie 2 (2001)
 American Pie 3: American Wedding (2003)
 American Pie Presents Band Camp (2005)
 American Pie 5: The Naked Mile (2007)
 American Pie Presents: Beta House (2007)
 American Pie Presents: The Book of Love (2009)
 American Reunion (2012)
 American Pie Presents: Girls' Rules (2020)
 American Poltergeist (2015)
 American Pop (1981)
 The American President (1995)
 American Psycho (2000)
 American Psycho 2: All American Girl (2002)
 An American Rhapsody (2001)
 The American Scream (2012)
 American Shaolin (1991)
 American Sniper (2014)
 American Son (2019)
 American Splendor (2003)
 An American Tail series:
 An American Tail (1986)
 An American Tail: Fievel Goes West (1991)
 An American Tail: The Mystery of the Night Monster (1999)
 An American Tail: The Treasure of Manhattan Island (1998)
 American Terror (2009)
 American Ultra (2015)
 American Underdog (2021)
 American Utopia (2020)
 American Violet (2009)
 An American Werewolf in London (1981)
 An American Werewolf in Paris (1997)
 Americana (1983)
 Americanese (2009)
 The Americanization of Emily (1964)
 Americathon (1979)
 Americký souboj (1913)
 A.M.I. (2019)
 Le Amiche (1955)
 Amigo (2010)
 Amigomío (1994)
 Amish Grace (2010)
 Amistad (1997)
 The Amityville Horror series:
 The Amityville Horror: (1979 & 2005)
 Amityville II: The Possession (1982)
 Amityville 3-D (1983)
 Amityville 4: The Evil Escapes (1984)
 The Amityville Curse (1990))
 Amityville: It's About Time (1992)
 Amityville: A New Generation (1993)
 Amityville Dollhouse (1996)
 Amityville: The Awakening (2017)
 Ammonite (2020)
 Amnesiac (2014)
 Among the Living: (1941 & 2014)
 Among the Shadows (2019)
 L'Amore in Città (1953)
 Amore! (1993)
 Amores perros (2000)
 Amorosa: (1986 & 2012)
 Amos & Andrew (1993)
 Amour: (1970 & 2012)
 L'Amour braque (1985)
 L'amour fou (1969)
 L'amour à mort (1984)
 The Amphibian Man (1962)
 Amreeka (2009)
 Amsterdam: (2013 & 2022)
 Amsterdamned (1988)
 Amuck! (1972)
 Amulet (2020)
 Amusement (2008)
 The Amusement Park (1975)
 The Amusements of Private Life (1990)
 Amy: (1981, 1984 TV, 1997 & 2015)
 The Amy Fisher Story (1993)

An

Ana–Ang

 Anaconda series:
 Anaconda (1997)
 Anacondas: The Hunt for the Blood Orchid (2004)
 Anaconda 3: Offspring (2008) (TV)
 Anacondas: Trail of Blood (2009) (TV)
 Lake Placid vs. Anaconda (2015) (TV)
 Anahat (2003)
 Analyze That (2002)
 Analyze This (1999)
 Anamika: (1973 & 2008)
 Anamorph (2007)
 Anand: (1971 & 2004)
 The Anarchist Cookbook (2002)
 Anarchists (2000)
 Anari: (1959, 1975 & 1993)
 Anastasia: (1956 & 1997)
 Anatomy (2000)
 Anatomy 2 (2003)
 Anatomy of Hell (2004)
 Anatomy of a Murder (1959)
 Anbe Aaruyire: (1975 & 2005)
 Anbe Sivam (2003)
 Anchoress (1993)
 Anchorman: The Legend of Ron Burgundy (2004)
 Anchorman 2: The Legend Continues (2013)
 Anchors Aweigh (1945)
 The Ancient Law (1923)
 The Ancient Mariner (1925)
 And (TBD)
 And the Band Played On (1993)
 And Everything is Going Fine (2010)
 And God Created Woman: (1956 & 1988)
 ...And Justice for All. (1979)
 And Life Goes On (1992)
 And Now My Love (1974)
 And Now for Something Completely Different (1971)
 And Now... Ladies and Gentlemen (2002)
 And the Sea Will Tell (1991)
 And the Ship Sails On (1983)
 And Soon the Darkness: (1970 & 2010)
 And the Spring Comes (2007)
 And Then There Were None: (1945, 1974 & 1987)
 And Then We Danced (2019)
 And You Thought Your Parents Were Weird (1991)
 Andaaz (2003)
 An Andalusian Dog (1929)
 Andarivaadu (2005)
 Andaz: (1949 & 1994)
 Andaz Apna Apna (1994)
 Andel Páne 2 (2016)
 The Anderson Tapes (1971)
 Andhrawala (2004)
 Andolan (1995)
 Andover (2017)
 Andre (1994)
 Andre Gregory: Before and After Dinner (2013)
 Andrei Rublev (1966)
 Andrew and Jeremy Get Married (2004)
 Androcles and the Lion (1952)
 Android (1982)
 The Andromeda Nebula (1967)
 The Andromeda Strain (1971)
 Ang Tanging Ina (2003)
 Angel: (1937, 1966 short, 1982 Greek, 1982 Irish, 1984, 1987, 2007, 2009 & 2011)
 Ángel (2007)
 The Angel: (1982 & 2007 short)
 Angel on the Amazon (1948)
 Angel Baby: (1961 & 1995)
 Angel and the Badman (1947)
 Angel Eyes (2001)
 Angel Face: (1953, 1998, 2008 & 2018)
 Angel Has Fallen (2019)
 Angel Heart (1987)
 Angel in My Pocket (1969)
 Angel on My Shoulder (1946)
 An Angel at My Table (1990)
 Angel Rodriguez (2005)
 An Angel for Satan (1966)
 Angel Square (1990)
 The Angel with the Trumpet: (1948 & 1950)
 Angel's Egg (1985)
 The Angel's Egg (2006)
 Angel-A (2005)
 Angela: (1978 & 1995)
 Angela's Ashes (1999)
 Angelfist (1993)
 Angels: (1990 & 2007)
 Angels & Demons (2009)
 Angels & Insects (1995)
 Angels with Dirty Faces (1938)
 Angels in the Endzone (1997)
 Angels in the Infield (2000)
 Angels One Five (1952)
 Angels in the Outfield: (1951 & 1994)
 Angels of Sin (1943)
 The Angels Wash Their Faces (1939)
 Angels in White (2012)
 Anger Management (2003)
 Angie: (1993 & 1994)
 Angoor: (1982 & 2013)
 Angora Love (1929)
 The Angry Birds Movie (2016)
 The Angry Birds Movie 2 (2019)
 The Angry Red Planet (1959)
 Angry Video Game Nerd: The Movie (2014)
 Angst: (1928, 1976, 1983, 2000 & 2003)
 Anguish (1987)
 Angulimaal (1960)
 Angulimala: (2003 & 2013)
 Angus (1995)
 Angus, Thongs and Perfect Snogging (2008)

Ani–Anz

 Aniki-Bóbó (1942)
 Anima Mundi (1991)
 Animal: (1977, 2001, 2005 & 2014)
 The Animal (2001)
 Animal Crackers: (1930 & 2018)
 Animal Factory (2000)
 Animal Farm: (1954 & 1999 TV)
 Animal House (1978)
 Animal Kingdom (2010)
 The Animal Kingdom (1932)
 Animals Are Beautiful People (1974)
 Animalympics (1980)
 The Animatrix series:
 Beyond (2003)
 A Detective Story (2003)
 Final Flight of the Osiris (2003)
 Kid's Story (2003)
 Matriculated (2003)
 Program (2003)
 The Second Renaissance (2003)
 World Record (2003)
 Anjaam (1994)
 Anjali: (1977 & 1990)
 Anjaneya (2003)
 Ankahee: (1985 & 2006)
 Ankuram (1993)
 Anmol (1993)
 Ankoku Joshi (2017)
 Anna: (1951, 1964, 1967 & 1987)
 Anna and the Apocalypse (2018)
 Anna Christie: (1923, 1930 English & 1930 German)
 Anna Karamazoff (1991)
 Anna Karenina: (1911, 1914, 1915, 1918, 1920, 1935, 1948, 1953, 1961 TV, 1967, 1975, 1985 TV, 1997 & 2012)
 Anna Karenina: Vronsky's Story (2017)
 Anna and the King (1999)
 Anna and the King of Siam (1946)
 Anna In Kungfuland (2003)
 Anna M. (2007)
 Annabelle series:
 Annabelle (2014)
 Annabelle: Creation (2017)
 Annabelle Comes Home (2019)
 Annamalai (1992)
 Annamayya (1997)
 Annapolis (2006)
 Anne at 13,000 Ft. (2019)
 "#Anne Frank Parallel Stories" (2019)
 Anne Frank Remembered (1995)
 Anne Frank: The Whole Story (2001 TV)
 Anne of Green Gables: (1919, 1934, 1956 TV, 1985 TV & 2016 TV)
 Anne no Nikki (1995)
 Anne of the Thousand Days (1969)
 Anne of Windy Poplars (1940)
 Annette (2021)
 Annie: (1976, 1982, 1999 TV & 2014)
 Annie Get Your Gun (1950)
 Annie Hall (1977)
 Annie's Coming Out (1984)
 Annie: A Royal Adventure! (1995 TV)
 Annihilation (2018)
 The Anniversary: (1968 & 2004 short)
 The Anniversary Party (2001)
 Anniyan (2005)
 Anon (2018)
 Anonymous (2011)
 Anonymous Rex (2004 TV)
 Another (2012)
 Another 48 Hrs. (1990)
 Another Day in Paradise (1998)
 Another Earth (2011)
 Another Fine Mess (1930)
 Another Gay Movie (2006)
 Another Girl Another Planet (1992)
 Another Happy Day (2011)
 Another Man's Poison (1952)
 Another Nice Mess (1972)
 Another Public Enemy (2005)
 Another Round (2020)
 Another Stakeout (1993)
 Another Thin Man (1939)
 Another Time, Another Place: (1958 & 1983)
 Another Wild Idea (1934)
 Another Woman (1988)
 Another Year (2010)
 Another You (1991)
 The Answer Man (2009)
 The Ant Bully (2006)
 Antar Mahal (2005)
 Antarctic Journal (2005)
 Antarnaad (1991)
 Antham (1992)
 Anthony Adverse (1936)
 Anthony Kaun Hai (2006)
 Anthony Zimmer (2005)
 Anthropocene: The Human Epoch (2018)
 Anthropoid (2016)
 Antibirth (2016)
 Antibodies (2005)
 Antichrist (2009)
 The Antichrist (1974)
 Antitrust (2001)
 Antiviral (2012)
 Antlers (2021)
 Ant-Man series:
 Ant-Man (2015)
 Ant-Man and the Wasp (2018)
 Ant-Man and the Wasp: Quantumania (2023)
 Antoine and Colette (1962)
 Anton Tchékhov 1890 (2015)
 Antoni Gaudí (1984)
 Antonia's Line (1995)
 Antonia: A Portrait of the Woman (1974)
 Antropophagus (1981)
 Antwone Fisher (2002)
 Antz (1998)
 Anupama: (1966 & 1981)
 Anusandhan (2021)
 Anvil! The Story of Anvil (2009)
 Any Bonds Today? (1942)
 Any Day Now: (1976, 2012 & 2020)
 Any Given Sunday (1999)
 Any Way the Wind Blows (2003)
 Any Which Way You Can (1980)
 Anything for Bread (1991)
 Anything Else (2003)
 Anything for Jackson (2020)
 Anything for Love (1993 TV)
 Anything to Survive (1990)
 Anytown, USA (2005)
 Anywhere But Here (1999)
 Anzio (1968)

Ao–Aq 

 Aola Star (2015)
 Aozora Yell (2016)
 Apache (1954)
 Aparajito (1957)
 Aparichita (1978)
 Apartment (2010)
 The Apartment: (1960 & 1996)
 Apartment 407 (2016)
 Apartment Hunting (2000)
 Apartment Zero (1988)
 Apasionados (2002)
 Ape: (1976 & 2012)
 The Ape: (1940, 2005, 2009)
 The Ape Man (1943)
 Ape and Super-Ape (1972)
 The Ape Woman (1964)
 Apocalypse Cult (2014)
 Apocalypse Now (1979)
 Apocalypto (2006)
 Apollo 10½: A Space Age Childhood (2022)
 Apollo 13 (1995)
 Apollo 18 (2011)
 Apollo: Missions to the Moon (2019)
 The Apostle (1997)
 Apostle (2018)
 App (2013)
 The App (2019)
 The Appaloosa (1966)
 Appaloosa (2008)
 The Apparition: (1903, 2012 & 2018)
 The Apple: (1980 & 1998)
 The Apple Dumpling Gang (1975)
 The Apple Dumpling Gang Rides Again (1979)
 Apple Trees (1992)
 Apples (2020)
 Applesauce (2015)
 Appleseed: (1988 & 2004)
 Appleseed Alpha (2014)
 Appointment with Danger (1950)
 Appointment with Death (1988)
 Appointment with Venus (1951)
 The Apprenticeship of Duddy Kravitz (1974)
 Appropriate Adult (2011)
 Appu: (2000 & 2002)
 L'Appât (1995)
 April: (1961 & 1998)
 April 1, 2000 (1952)
 April 1st Vidudhala (1991)
 April Bride (2009)
 April and the Extraordinary World (2015)
 April Fool: (1926, 1964 & 2010)
 April Fool's Day: (1986 & 2008)
 April Fools: (2007 & 2015)
 April in Paris (1952)
 April Showers: (1923, 1948 & 2009)
 April Snow (2005)
 April Story (1998)
 APT (2006)
 Apt Pupil (1998)
 Apur Sansar (1959)
 The Aqua Teen Hunger Force Colon Movie Film for Theaters (2007)
 Aquaman (2018)
 Aquaman and the Lost Kingdom (2023)
 Aquamarine (2006)

Ar

 Ara (2008)
 Arabella: (1924 & 1967)
 Arabesque (1966)
 Arabian Nights: (1942, 1974 & 2015)
 Arachnid (2001)
 Arachnophobia (1990)
 Aradhana: (1962, 1969 & 1987)
 Araf (2006)
 Aragami (2003)
 Arahan (2004)
 Aran (2006)
 Arang (2006)
 Aranya Rodan (1993)
 Aranyer Din Ratri (1970)
 Ararat (2002)
 Arbitrage (2012)
 L'Arbre, le maire et la médiathèque (1993)
 Arcade (1993)
 The Arch (1968)
 Arch of Triumph: (1948 & 1985 TV)
 Archangel: (1991 & 2005 TV)
 The Archangel (1969)
Archie series:
Archie: To Riverdale and Back Again (1990 TV)
The Archies in Jugman (2007 TV)
 The Architecture of Doom (1989)
 Arctic (2018)
 Arctic Blue (1993)
 Are We Done Yet? (2007)
 Are We Officially Dating? (2014)
 Are We There Yet? (2005)
 Are You in the House Alone? (1978 TV)
 Are You Scared? (2006)
 Are You There God? It's Me, Margaret (2022)
 Area 51 (2015)
 The Arena: (1974 & 2001 TV)
 Arena: (1953, 1989, 2009 & 2011)
 Argentina, 1985 (2022)
 L'Argent: (1928 & 1983)
 Argo (2012)
 Argument About Basia (1995)
 Argylle (TBD)
 Aria (1987)
 Arinthum Ariyamalum (2005)
 Arirang: (1926 & 2011)
 Arirang 3 (1936)
 Arirang Geuhu Iyagi (1930)
 Arisan! (2003)
 The Aristocats (1970)
 The Aristocrats (2005)
 Aristotle and Dante Discover the Secrets of the Universe (2022)
 Arizona Colt (1966)
 Arizona Dream (1993)
 Arizona Heat (1988)
 Arjun: (1985 & 2004)
 Ark (2004)
 Arkansas (2020)
 Arlington Road (1999)
 Armaan: (1966 & 2003)
 Armageddon: (1997 & 1998)
 Armageddon Time (2022)
 L'armata Brancaleone (1986)
 Armed (2018)
 Armed and Dangerous: (1986)
 Armed and Innocent (1994)
 Armitage III: Poly-Matrix (1997)
 Armor Hero Atlas (2014)
 Armor Hero Captor King (2016)
 Armored (2009)
 Armored Car Robbery (1950)
 Armour of God series:
 Armour of God (1987)
 Armour of God II: Operation Condor (1991)
 The Armstrong Lie (2013)
 Army Intelligence (1994)
 Army of Darkness (1992)
 Army of the Dead: (2008 & 2021)
 Army of Shadows (1969)
 Army of Thieves (2021)
 L'Armée des ombres (1988)
 Arn: The Knight Templar (2007)
 Arnold (1973)
 Aro Tolbukhin. En la mente del asesino (2002)
 The Aroma of Tea (2006)
 Around the Bend (2004)
 Around a Small Mountain (2009)
 Around the World in 80 Days: (1956, 1988 & 2004)
 Around the World in 80 Minutes with Douglas Fairbanks (1931)
 Around the World Under the Sea (1966)
 Around the World with Dot (1981)
 Arranged (2007)
 The Arrangement (1969)
 Arrebato (1980)
 Arresting Gena (1997)
 Arrietty (2010)
 Arrival (2016)
 The Arrival: (1991 & 1996)
 The Arrival of Averill (1992)
 The Arrival from the Darkness (1921)
 Arrivée d'un train en gare de la Ciotat (1895)
 Arrivée d'un train gare de Vincennes (1896)
 L'Arroseur (1896)
 L'Arroseur Arrosé (1895)
 Arrowsmith (1931)
 Arsenal (1929)
 Arsenal (2017)
 The Arsenal Stadium Mystery (1940)
 Arsenic and Old Lace (1944)
 The Arsonist (1995)
 Arsène Lupin (2004)
 Art & Copy (2009)
 Art Deco Detective (1994)
 Art of the Devil series:
 Art of the Devil (2004)
 Art of the Devil 2 (2005)
 Art of the Devil 3 (2008)
 Art of Fighting (2006)
 The Art of Getting By (2011)
 Art Museum by the Zoo (1998)
 The Art of Racing in the Rain (2019)
 Art and Remembrance: The Legacy of Felix Nussbaum (1993)
 Art School Confidential (2006)
 The Art of Seduction (2005)
 The Art of Self Defense (1941)
 The Art of Self-Defense (2019)
 The Art of War (2000)
 The Art of War II: Betrayal (2008)
 The Art of War III: Retribution (2009)
 Artemis Fowl (2020)
 Artemisia (1998)
 Arth (1982)
 Arthur: (1981 & 2011)
 Arthur series:
 Arthur and the Invisibles (2006)
 Arthur and the Revenge of Maltazard (2009)
 Arthur 3: The War of the Two Worlds (2011)
 Arthur 2: On the Rocks (1988)
 Arthur Christmas (2011)
 Arthur Newman (2012)
 Article 15 (2019)
 Artie Lange's Beer League (2006)
 Artificial Intelligence: A.I. (2001)
 Artificial Paradise (1990)
 The Artist (2011)
 The Artist and the Mannikin (1900)
 The Artist and the Model (2012)
 The Artist's Wife (2019)
 Artists and Models: (1937 & 1955)
 Aru yo no Tonosama (1946)
 Arul (2004)
 Arya: (2004 & 2007)
 Arya 2 (2009)
 Aryan: (1988 & 2006)
 The Aryan (1916)

As

 As Above, So Below (2014)
 As Cool as I Am (2013)
 As Crazy as It Gets (2015)
 As Dreams Are Made On (2004)
 As Far as My Feet Will Carry Me (2001)
 As God Commands (2008)
 As God Made Her (1920)
 As the Gods Will (2014)
 As Goes Janesville (2012)
 As Good as Dead: (1995 & 2010)
 As Good as It Gets (1997)
 As Good as Married (1937)
 As Good as New (1933)
 As Husbands Go (1934)
 As I Lay Dying (2013)
 As I Open My Eyes (2015)
 As I Was Moving Ahead Occasionally I Saw Brief Glimpses of Beauty (2000)
 As I'm Suffering From Kadhal (2017)
 As If I Am Not There (2010)
 As Ilf and Petrov rode a tram (1972)
 As In Heaven (1992)
 As Is (1986 TV)
 As It Is in Heaven (2004)
 As It Is In Life (1910)
 As Long as I Live (1946)
 As Long as the Roses Bloom (1956)
 As Long as They're Happy (1955)
 As Long as You Live (1955)
 As Long as You're Near Me (1953)
 As Long as You've Got Your Health (1966)
 As Luck Would Have It (2011)
 As Man Desires (1925)
 As Man Made Her (1917)
 As Men Love (1917)
 As Needed (2018)
 As Night Comes (2014)
 As Night Falls (2013)
 As One (2012)
 As Seen Through a Telescope (1900)
 As Tears Go By (1988)
 As White as in Snow (2001)
 As You Like It: (1936 & 2006)

Asa-Asy

 Asa Branca: Um Sonho Brasileiro (1981)
 Asa Nu Maan Watna Da (2004)
 Asad (2012)
 Asahinagu (2017)
 Asahiyama Zoo Story: Penguins in the Sky (2009)
 Asai Man Piyabanna (2007)
 Asalto a la ciudad (1968)
 Asambhav (2004)
 Asambhava (1986)
 Asandhimitta (2019)
 Asathal (2001)
 Ascendancy (1983)
 Ascension (2021)
 The Ascent: (1977 & 1994)
 Ascharya Fuck It (2018)
 Asehi Ekada Vhave (2018)
 Ash Is Purest White (2018)
 Ash Wednesday: (1925, 1931, 1958, 1973 & 2002)
 Ashani Sanket (1973)
 Ashanti: (1979 & 1982)
 Ashes and Diamonds (1958)
 Ashes in the Snow (2018)
 Ashes of Time (1994)
 Ashik Kerib (1988)
 Ashok (2006)
 Ashoka Vanamlo Arjuna Kalyanam (2022)
 Ashokan (1993)
 Asian Stories (2006)
 Ask the Dust (2006)
 Ask A Policeman (1939)
 Asoka: (1955 & 2001)
 Aspen Extreme (1993)
 The Asphalt Jungle (1950)
 The Assassin: (1961 & 2015)
 The Assassin of the Tsar (1991)
 Assassin of Youth (1937)
 Assassination: (1927, 1964, 1967, 1987 & 2015)
 The Assassination Bureau (1969)
 Assassination Classroom (2015)
 Assassination Classroom: Graduation (2016)
 Assassination of a High School President (2008)
 The Assassination of Jesse James by the Coward Robert Ford (2007)
 The Assassination of Richard Nixon (2004)
 The Assassination of Trotsky (1972)
 Assassination Nation (2018)
 Assassination Tango (2002)
 Assassins: (1995 & 2020)
 The Assassins (2012)
 Assassin's Creed (2016)
 Assault Girls (2009)
 Assault on a Queen (1966)
 Assault on Precinct 13: (1976 & 2005)
 Assault on Wall Street (2013)
 Assembly (2007)
 Assia and the Hen with the Golden Eggs (1994)
 The Assignment: (1977, 1997 & 2016)
 Assimilate (2019)
 The Assistant: (1982, 1998, 2015 & 2019)
 Assunta Spina: (1915, 1930 & 1948)
 Asterix series:
 Asterix and the Big Fight (1989)
 Asterix in Britain (1986)
 Asterix and Cleopatra (1968)
 Asterix Conquers America (1994)
 Asterix the Gaul (1967)
 Asterix Versus Caesar (1985)
 Asterix and the Vikings (2006)
 Asteroid (1997) (TV)
 Asteroid City (2023)
 The Astounding She-Monster (1957)
 Astro Boy (2009)
 The Astro-Zombies (1968)
 The Astronaut Farmer (2006)
 The Astronaut's Wife (1999)
 Asunder (1999)
 Asura (2018)
 Asylum: (1972 horror, 1972 documentary, 1997, 2003, 2005 & 2008)
 Asylum Blackout (2011)

At

 At Any Price (2012)
 At First Sight: (1917 & 1999)
 At Cafe 6 (2016)
 At the Circus (1939)
 At Close Range (1986)
 At the Devil's Door (2014)
 At the Earth's Core (1976)
 At the Edge of Conquest: The Journey of Chief Wai-Wai (1992)
 At the Edge of the Law (1992)
 At the End of the Day: The Sue Rodriguez Story (1998)
 At Eternity's Gate (2018)
 At Ground Zero (1994)
 At Home Among Strangers (1974)
 At Long Last Love (1975)
 At the Max (1991)
 At Midnight I'll Take Your Soul (1964)
 At the Order of the Czar (1954)
 At Play in the Fields of the Lord (1991)
 At Risk (1994)
 At War with the Army (1950)
 L'Atalante (1934)
 Atanarjuat: The Fast Runner (2001)
 Athena: (1954 & 2022)
 Athisaya Piravi (1990)
 The Athlete (2009)
 Atithi Devo Bhava (2022)
 ATL (2006)
 Atlantic (1929)
 Atlantic City: (1944 & 1980)
 Atlantics (2019)
 Atlantis: (1913 & 1991)
 The Atlantis Interceptors (1983)
 Atlantis, the Lost Continent (1961)
 Atlantis: The Lost Empire (2001)
 Atlantis: Milo's Return (2003)
 Atlantis Rising (2017)
 Atlas Shrugged series:
 Atlas Shrugged: Part I (2011)
 Atlas Shrugged: Part II (2012)
 Atlas Shrugged Part III: Who Is John Galt? (2014)
 ATM (2012)
 Atoll K (1950)
 Atomic Blonde (2017)
 The Atomic Cafe (1982)
 The Atomic Fireman (1952)
 The Atomic Kid (1954)
 The Atomic Man (1955)
 The Atomic Submarine (1959)
 Atomic Train (1999)
 Atonement: (1919 & 2007)
 Ator series:
Ator, the Fighting Eagle (1982)
Ator 2 – L'invincibile Orion (1984)
Iron Warrior (1987)
Quest for the Mighty Sword (1990)
 Atragon (1963)
 Attack: (1956 & 2016)
 The Attack: (1966 & 2012)
 Attack of the 50 Foot Cheerleader (2012)
 Attack of the 50 Foot Woman (1958)
 Attack of the 50 Ft. Woman (1993)
 Attack of the 60 Foot Centerfold (1995)
 Attack the Block (2011)
 Attack of the Crab Monsters (1957)
 Attack Force Z (1982)
 Attack the Gas Station (1999)
 Attack of the Giant Leeches (1959)
 Attack of the Killer Tomatoes (1978)
 Attack of Life: The Bang Tango Movie (2016)
 Attack of the Monsters (1969)
 Attack of the Mushroom People (1963)
 Attack on the Pin-Up Boys (2007)
 Attack of the Puppet People (1958)
 Attack on Titan (2015) 
 Attack: Part 1 (2022)
 The Attacks of 26/11 (2013)
 Attagasam (2004)
 Attenberg (2010)
 The Attic (2007)
 The Attic Expeditions (2001)
 Attica (1980) (TV)
 Attilas '74 (1975)
 Attraction (2017)

Au-Az

 Au Hasard Balthazar (1966)
 Au Pair series:
 Au Pair (1999)
 Au Pair II (2001)
 Au Pair 3: Adventure in Paradise (2009)
 Au Revoir, Les Enfants (1987)
 Au Revoir, UFO (2004)
 L'Auberge Espagnole (2002)
 The Auction Block: (1917 & 1926)
 The Auctioneer (1927)
 Audace colpo dei soliti ignoti (1959)
 Audition: (1999, 2005 & 2007)
 The Audition: (2000 short & 2015 short)
 Auditions (1978)
 Audrey Rose (1977)
 Auggie Rose (2000)
 August: (1996, 2008 & 2011)
 August 32nd on Earth (1998)
 August Rush (2006)
 August Underground series:
 August Underground (2001)
 August Underground's Mordum (2003)
 August Underground's Penance (2007)
 August: Osage County (2013)
 Augustin (1995)
 Auntie Mame (1958)
 El Aura (2005)
 Aurangzeb (2013)
 Aurora: Operation Intercept (1995)
 Aurore (2005)
 Auschwitz (2011)
 Austin Powers series:
 Austin Powers in Goldmember (2002)
 Austin Powers: International Man of Mystery (1997)
 Austin Powers: The Spy Who Shagged Me (1999)
 Australia: (1989 & 2008)
 Australian Rules (2002)
 Auto Focus (2002)
 Autobiography of a Princess (1975)
 Autograph: (2004 & 2010)
 Automaton Transfusion (2006)
 Automatons (2006)
 The Automobile Thieves (1906)
 Autopsy: (1975 & 2008)
 The Autopsy of Jane Doe (2016)
 Autour d'une cabine (1895)
 Autumn: (1930, 1974, 1990, 2008 & 2009)
 Autumn Adagio (2009)
 An Autumn Afternoon (1962)
 Autumn Ball (2007)
 Autumn Leaves (1956)
 Autumn Moon (1992)
 Autumn in New York (2000)
 Autumn Sonata (1978)
 Autumn Tale (1998)
 Ava: (2017 French, 2017 Iranian, & 2020)
 Avakasi (1954)
 Avalanche Alley (2001)
 Avalon: (1990 & 2001)
 Avalon High (2010 TV)
 Avanti! (1972)
 Avatar: (1916 & 2004)
 Avatar series:
 Avatar (2009)
 Avatar: The Way of Water (2022)
 Avatar 3 (2024)
 Avec les Hommes de l'eau (1938)
 The Avengers: (1950 & 1998)
 The Avengers series:
 The Avengers (2012)
 Avengers: Age of Ultron (2015)
 Avengers: Endgame (2019)
 Avengers: Infinity War (2018)
 Avengers Confidential: Black Widow & Punisher (2014)
 Avenging Angelo (2002)
 The Avenging Conscience (1914)
 Aventure Malgache (1944)
 Les Aventures de Till L'Espiègle (1956)
 The Aviator: (1929, 1985 & 2004)
 The Aviator's Wife (1981)
 Avtaar (1983)
 Avvai Shanmugi (1996)
 Avvaiyyar (1953)
 L'avventura (1960)
 Awaara (1951)
 Awaargi (1990)
 Await Further Instructions (2018)
 Awake: (2007, 2019 & 2021)
 Awakening: (1959 & 2013)
 The Awakening: (1917, 1928, 1954, 1956, 1980, 2006 & 2011)
 Awakening of Rip (1896)
 Awakenings (1990)
 Awara Paagal Deewana (2002)
 Awaragira (1990)
 Away from Her (2007)
 Away We Go (2009)
 Awesome; I Fuckin' Shot That! (2006)
 The Awful Truth (1937)
 An Awfully Big Adventure (1995)
 An Awkward Balance (2020)
 Awoken (2019)
 Axe Giant: The Wrath of Paul Bunyan (2013)
 Aya Sawan Jhoom Ke (1969)
 Ayam El-Sadat (2001)
 Aye Auto (1990)
 Ayee Milan Ki Bela (1964)
 Azhagan (1991)
 Azor (2021)
 The Aztec Mummy (1957)
 Aztec Revenge (2015)
 Azumi (2003)
 Azumi 2: Death or Love (2005)

Previous:  List of films: 0–9    Next:  List of films: B

See also 
 Lists of films
 Lists of actors
 List of film and television directors
 List of documentary films
 List of film production companies

-